Turkish Delight is a 1973 Dutch erotic romantic drama film directed by Paul Verhoeven from a screenplay by Gerard Soeteman, based on the 1969 novel Turks Fruit by Jan Wolkers. It is a love story of an artist and a young woman, starring Rutger Hauer in his film debut and Monique van de Ven.

Turkish Delight is the most successful film in the history of Dutch cinema. The film was a massive success at the Dutch box office; according to Alle Record, 3,338,000 people saw the film, while the Netherlands Film Festival puts it at 3.5 million, corresponding to about 26% of the population of the Netherlands at the time. In 1973 it was nominated for an Academy Award for Best Foreign Language Film and in 1999, it received a special Golden Calf Award for Best Dutch Film of the Century. It was entered into the Canon of Dutch Cinema in 2007. In 2005, it was adapted into a musical, starring Antonie Kamerling and Jelka van Houten.

Plot
Sculptor Eric Vonk wakes up recalling disturbing dreams where he murders characters still unknown to the audience. He eventually cleans up his dingy studio, but only to trawl the streets of Amsterdam in search of random women whom he takes back home for sex. This combination of violent fantasies, promiscuity and occasional misogyny is not intrinsic to him, but rather the outcome of a distressing memory: his failed relationship with Olga Stapels. The film then flashes back two years to the time they first met.

Olga picks Eric up when he is hitchhiking, and they immediately have sex in her car. This first tryst is followed by a traffic accident, and Eric is initially prevented from seeing Olga again by her middle-class mother, who strongly dislikes him and blames him for the crash. However, the two lovers reconnect and start a passionate affair which, while opposed by her mother, is seen sympathetically by her easy-going father. They eventually get married, and Olga's mother and closest circle of friends grudgingly accept Eric.

Some time later, Eric lands a 5000-guilder commission to prepare a sculpture for the garden of the hospital where his friend Paul works. Olga models for the statue, which is unveiled by the Dutch queen. The unveiling ceremony is successful for the hospital, but the artist and model are prevented from attending on the front line by the queen's security detail because of Olga's revealing dress. Out of frustration, Eric and Olga throw the maquettes into the canals of Amsterdam.

Olga's father's dies from illness shortly thereafter. Instead of taking care of the Stapels family business, Eric then takes Olga back to Amsterdam where he continues his artistic career and she takes a job in a production line. This infuriates her mother, who feels that a Bohemian sculptor earning little from occasional commissions is an unsuitable husband.

Their life together, while initially happy, is marred by bouts of strange behavior on Olga's behalf, including unexplainable reveries and rampant impulsivity. This tendency reaches a pitch of conflict in a family gathering in a Chinese restaurant. Eric finds himself insidiously baited into following Olga to the party, where he witnesses her flirting openly with a family friend, with the overt complicity of the rest of the diners. This prompts Eric to vomit over the attendants and slap Olga. She then leaves Eric, who proceeds to trash his studio, destroying anything that reminded him of her. This brings the movie to the point where it opened, ending the flashback.

Eric is still obsessed with Olga. Her family refuses to let him visit her, until he says he has come to arrange a divorce. His short stay sours when Olga's mother walks in on them having rough sex, and he is banished from her life permanently. Olga later becomes engaged to a wealthy American and visits Eric to pick up the remainder of her things before leaving for the United States. Eric comes to terms with her departure, and his closure is symbolized by a minor subplot in which he rescues a wounded seagull and sets if free once its wing heals.

Some time later, Eric walks into a commercial center and spots Olga, flamboyantly dressed and acting oddly. She reveals that her American experience was a disaster and that she is living with her mother again. She suddenly collapses and Eric takes her to Paul's hospital, where she is diagnosed as having a brain tumor. Surgical intervention to remove the entire tumor is not entirely successful, and her death becomes an inevitable matter of course. Eric brings her a wig and Turkish delight, which is the only thing she will eat, as she fears harder food will break a loose tooth. Soon after, she has a seizure and dies. Eric walks outside, past his sculpture of Olga, and solemnly dumps her wig in a trash disposal.

Cast

 Monique van de Ven as Olga Stapels
 Rutger Hauer as Eric Vonk
 Tonny Huurdeman as Olga's Mother
 Wim van den Brink as Olga's Father
 Hans Boskamp as Shop Manager
 Dolf de Vries as Paul
 Manfred de Graaf as Henny
 Dick Scheffer as Accountant
 Marjol Flore as Tineke
 Bert Dijkstra as Civil Servant

Production
Filming locations included Amsterdam, Alkmaar, Rotterdam and Zaandam in the Netherlands.

See also
 List of submissions to the 46th Academy Awards for Best Foreign Language Film
 List of Dutch submissions for the Academy Award for Best Foreign Language Film

References

External links
 
 
 

1973 films
1973 romantic drama films
1970s erotic drama films
Dutch erotic drama films
1970s Dutch-language films
Dutch romantic drama films
Erotic romance films
Films based on Dutch novels
Films directed by Paul Verhoeven
Films produced by Rob Houwer
Films set in the Netherlands
Films shot in Amsterdam
Films about sculptors